San Juan de Dios is a corregimiento in Antón District, Coclé Province, Panama. The population in 1990 was 6,199 an in 2000 was 4,214.

References

Corregimientos of Coclé Province